Aleheride  is a village in the Assoli Prefecture in the Kara Region  of north-eastern Togo.

References

Aleheride is the Village Located in centre of Togo prefecture of Tchaoudjo

External links
Satellite map at Maplandia.com

Populated places in Kara Region
Assoli Prefecture